Kathryn Ann Heck (born February 24, 1943) is an American former volleyball player. She played for the United States national team at the 1967 Pan American Games and the 1968 Summer Olympics. She was born in Oxnard, California.

References

1943 births
Living people
Olympic volleyball players of the United States
Volleyball players at the 1968 Summer Olympics
Volleyball players at the 1967 Pan American Games
Pan American Games gold medalists for the United States
Sportspeople from Oxnard, California
American women's volleyball players
Pan American Games medalists in volleyball
Sportspeople from Ventura County, California
Medalists at the 1967 Pan American Games
UC Santa Barbara Gauchos women's volleyball players
20th-century American women